Dongning is a county-level city of southeastern Heilongjiang province, China. It is under the jurisdiction of the prefecture-level city of Mudanjiang.

Administrative divisions 
Dongning City is divided into 6 towns. 
6 towns
 Dongning, Sanchakou, Daduchuan, Laoheishan, Daohe, Suiyang

Demographics 

Climate

Notes and references

External links
  Government site - 

 
Dongning
Mudanjiang